Nagarze may refer to places in Tibet:

Nagarzê County, a county
Nagarzê, Tibet, a town